Michelle DuBarry is the stage name of Russell Alldread (born November 23, 1931), a Canadian drag queen, who was awarded the title of World's Oldest Performing Drag Queen by the Guinness Book of World Records in 2015. However, the distinction was disputed by another performer, who was subsequently awarded the title in 2016.

Background
Born in Bowmanville, Ontario in 1931, Alldread was a performer in childhood, winning an award for his singing at the Port Hope Music Festival in 1939. Around the same time, he had his first experience dressing in drag, when his cousins dressed him in a strapless gown for a photo shoot. He continued to be involved in theatre until moving to Toronto at age 18.

He worked for General Motors and began having relationships with men, although he met and married a woman in 1957.

Performing career
After divorcing from his wife in 1961, Alldread began performing in drag shows, initially under the name Anita Modé. He adopted the name Michelle DuBarry in 1969 upon joining the Phase One drag troupe, taking his new performing surname from the 1943 film Du Barry Was a Lady. When his colleagues in Phase One later moved to Vancouver, DuBarry formed a new trio, The Great Impostors, with Tammy Autumn and Rusty Ryan.

In his day job, Alldread worked as a women's shoe salesman.

As DuBarry, he has been involved in the Trillium Monarchist Society and the Expressions Club, and has held the title of Empress of Toronto in the Imperial Court System. He continued to perform as a drag queen in Toronto, including bar shows and charity fundraisers for causes such as HIV/AIDS awareness and Gilda's Club. DuBarry served as grand marshal of Toronto's Pride parade in 2007.

DuBarry's signature number as a performer is Nancy LaMott's "We Can Be Kind".

Following the announcement of DuBarry's Guinness distinction, some residents of Portland, Oregon argued that the title should instead be awarded to Darcelle XV, who is a year older than Alldread. Darcelle was awarded the title by Guinness on August 15, 2016.

In 2020 DuBarry appeared as a guest in the seventh episode of the first season of Canada's Drag Race, appearing as a judge in the Miss Loose Jaw Pageant, that week's maxi challenge.

In 2021, CBC Radio One's The Doc Project aired a documentary feature on DuBarry, suggesting that the COVID-19 pandemic, and the associated shutdown of nearly all drag-related venues and events in 2020, had dampened Alldread's enthusiasm for going out as Michelle anymore. In 2022, after beginning to show some symptoms of dementia, Alldread moved into a long-term care home, and a sale of some of his drag outfits and jewellery was staged at The 519 in April.

References

External links
 Michelle DuBarry on the Internet Movie Database

1931 births
Living people
Canadian drag queens
People from Clarington
People from Toronto
20th-century Canadian LGBT people
21st-century Canadian LGBT people